EPAM (Elementary Perceiver and Memorizer) is a  psychological theory of learning and memory implemented as a computer program. Originally designed by Herbert A. Simon and Edward Feigenbaum to simulate phenomena in verbal learning, it has been later adapted to account for data on the psychology of expertise and concept formation. It was influential in formalizing the concept of a chunk.  In EPAM, learning consists in the growth of a discrimination network.
EPAM was written in IPL/V.

The project was started in the late 1950s with the aim to learn nonsense syllables. The term nonsense is used because the learned patterns are not connected with a meaning but they are standing for their own. The software is working internally by creating a decision tree. An improved version is available under the name “EPAM-VI”.

Related cognitive models

CHREST
Soar

References

Feigenbaum, E. A., & Simon, H. A. (1962). A theory of the serial position effect. British Journal of Psychology, 53, 307–320.
Feigenbaum, E. A., & Simon, H. A. (1984). EPAM-like models of recognition and learning. Cognitive Science, 8, 305–336.
Gobet, F., Richman, H. B., Staszewski, J. J., & Simon, H. A. (1997). Goals, representations, and strategies in a concept attainment task: The EPAM model. The Psychology of Learning and Motivation, 37, 265–290.
Richman, H. B., Gobet, F., Staszewski, J. J., & Simon, H. A. (1996). Perceptual and memory processes in the acquisition of expert performance: The EPAM model. In K. A. Ericsson (Ed.), The road to excellence (pp. 167–187). Mahwah, NJ: Erlbaum.
Richman, H. B., Staszewski, J. J., & Simon, H. A. (1995). Simulation of expert memory with EPAM IV. Psychological Review, 102, 305–330.

Cognitive architecture